Luc Van Lierde (born 14 April 1969 in Bruges) is a former athlete from Belgium, who has been competing in triathlon since 1990 and who has been a professional triathlon coach since 2009.

Athletic career
Van Lierde's international career started in 1990 when he came fourth in the World Olympic Distance Triathlon Championships. In the full-length Ironman triathlon, which involves swimming 3.8 km, cycling 180 km and running a 42.2 km marathon, he was ranked among the first ten in the European Championships three times between 1990 and 1995. 1995 was a decisive year for Luc Van Lierde, when he took second place at the ITU World Championships, and came second in the European Olympic Distance Triathlon Championships.

In 1996 he won the European Championships and came second in the World Championships in the Olympic Distance Triathlon. He won the Nice Triathlon and became World Long Course Triathlon Champion. Luc Van Lierde became the first European ever to win the Ironman World Championship, beating the existing record by three minutes.

Luc Van Lierde went on to clock the fastest Ironman Triathlon ever in 1997, doing 7:50:27 (0:44, 4:28, 2:36, plus transition) in Ironman Europe. Absent from the Ironman 1998, after undergoing an operation, he nevertheless won the Flemish Sports Personality of the Year trophy. In 1999, he once again won the Ironman World Championship in Hawaii, outrunning the second placed competitor by six minutes. During that same year, he received the Giant of Flanders trophy awarded by the two Flanders section of the Association of Professional Journalists.

Triathlon coach

In 2009, after more than 20 years as a professional triathlete, Van Lierde began a career as a triathlon coach. Frederik Van Lierde (not related) approached Van Lierde with the request to coach him. One year later he managed to coach Frederik Van Lierde to a third place at the 2012 Ironman World Championship. In 2013, he coached Frederik to the 2013 Ironman World Championship. 

Van Lierde has successfully coached several other professional athletes, including Marino Vanhoenacker, Iván Raña, Will Clarke, Michelle Vesterby, and Saleta Castro.

Notable achievements 
 1995: Silver medal at the World Championships
 1996: European Champion
 1996: Silver medal at the World Championships in the Quarter Triathlon
 1996: Silver medal at the World Championships
 1996: Winner Ironman World Championship (new record)
 1997: World Record for Ironman event (7:50:27)
 1998: Gold medal at the Long Distance World Championship in Sado Island
 1999: Winner Ironman World Championship
 2000: Winner St. Croix Triathlon (2k/55k/12k)
 2003: Winner Ironman Malaysia
 2004: Winner Ironman Malaysia
 2007: 2nd Ironman Lanzarote
 2007: 8th Ironman Hawaii 8:30

External links
Personal website
Outside magazine, November 1997
Luc Van Lierde ITU Profile Page

Belgian male triathletes
Ironman world champions
1969 births
Living people
Sportspeople from Bruges
Triathlon coaches